Deborah Manship (born 25 September 1953) is a Welsh actress, best known for her roles in the television drama series Angels (as Sister Valerie Price) and The District Nurse (as Nesta Mogg).

She later appeared in the Doctor Who serial The Greatest Show in the Galaxy and The Bill 1994.

External links
 

1953 births
Living people
Welsh television actresses
Place of birth missing (living people)
20th-century Welsh actresses